Millard (also Barkers Corners) is an unincorporated community located in the town of Sugar Creek, Walworth County, Wisconsin, United States.

Notable people
Thomas Davis, Wisconsin politician, lived in Millard.

Notes

Unincorporated communities in Walworth County, Wisconsin
Unincorporated communities in Wisconsin